The 2010 Acrobatic Gymnastics World Championships was the 22nd edition of acrobatic gymnastics competition and were held in Wrocław, Poland from 16 to 18 July 2010, at the Hala Orbita.

Results

Men's pair

Women's pair

Mixed pair

Men's group

Women's group

Medal table

References

External links
 

Acrobatic Gymnastics World Championships
Acrobatic Gymnastics World Championships
Acrobatic World 2008
Sport in Wrocław
Acrobatic Gymnastics